Eric or Erik Knudsen may refer to:

 Eric Knudsen, a professor of neurology at Stanford University
 Eric Alfred Knudsen, American author and politician
 Eric Knudsen, creator of the Slender Man character
 Erik Knudsen, Canadian actor
 Erik Skovgaard Knudsen, Danish mountain bike orienteer

See also
 Erik Knutsson